Kevin "Bones" Kelly (born 7 August 1969 in La Perouse, New South Wales) is an Australian retired professional welter/light middle/middleweight boxer of the 1990s and 2000s who won the South Australia State welterweight title, New South Wales (Australia) State welterweight title, New South Wales (Australia) State light middleweight title, Australian light middleweight title, Pan Asian Boxing Association (PABA) light middleweight title, World Boxing Union (WBU) middleweight title, and Commonwealth light middleweight title (twice), and was a challenger for the World Boxing Association (WBA) World light middleweight title against David Reid, and World Boxing Organization (WBO) Inter-Continental light middleweight title against Gary Lockett, his professional fighting weight varied from , i.e. welterweight to , i.e. middleweight.

Professional boxing record

References

External links

1969 births
Boxers from Sydney
Light-middleweight boxers
Indigenous Australian boxers
Living people
Middleweight boxers
Welterweight boxers
Australian male boxers
Commonwealth Boxing Council champions